1,2-Dichloro-1,1,2-trifluoroethane is a volatile liquid chlorofluoroalkane composed of carbon, hydrogen, chlorine and fluorine, and with structural formula CClF2CHClF. It is also known as a refrigerant with the designation R-123a.

Formation
1,1,2-Trichloro-1,2,2-trifluoroethane can be biotransformed in sewage sludge to 1,2-dichloro-1,1,2-trifluoroethane.

Properties
The rotation of the molecule appears to be hindered by the present of chlorine on each carbon atom, but is eased at higher temperatures.

Use
Although not deliberately used, R-123a is a significant impurity in its isomer, the widely used 2,2-dichloro-1,1,1-trifluoroethane (R-123).

References

External links
 

Hydrochlorofluorocarbons